Triston Wade (born May 19, 1993) is a former American football free safety. He signed with the  Seattle Seahawks of the National Football League (NFL) as an undrafted free agent after the 2015 NFL Draft. He played in college for UTSA.

Early life and high school career
Wade was born on May 19, 1993, in Tyler, Texas. He attended Tyler High School in Tyler, Texas. In 2010 he earned Second-Team Class 4A All-State and First-Team All-East Texas honors after having 122 tackles, six interceptions, and a pair of forced fumbles. He was also named the District 14-4A Defensive Most Valuable Player.

College career
In 2011, Wade's true freshman season, he played in all ten games, earning starts in four of them. He had 39 tackles, two interceptions, and three fumbles forced on the season.
In 2012, Wade played and started all twelve games for the Roadrunners. He earned First-Team All-WAC honors after ending the season tied for the team lead with four interceptions. He finished the season with 74 tackles, four interceptions, and eleven pass breakups. In the season opener he forced a fumble on a kickoff return and also had an interception alongside a career-high eleven tackles in the season opener against the South Alabama Jaguars. After that performance he earned WAC Defensive Player of the Week and an honorable mention for the Jim Thorpe Defensive Back of the Week.

In 2013, Wade was voted as a team captain and was named to the Second-Team All-C-USA team. On the year he had 94 total tackles, which is good enough for second in UTSA history, he also had two interceptions and seven pass breakups. He had both of his interceptions in a game against Tulsa, with one of them being returned 82 yards for a touchdown.

In 2014, Wade's senior season, he was once again named a team captain. He started all eleven games for the team with a team-leading 81 tackles, four interceptions, and thirteen pass breakups. He was one of fifteen Jim Thorpe Award semifinalists. He finished his career as UTSA's all-time leader in tackles (288), pass breakups (34), interceptions (12), forced fumbles (8), and fumble recoveries (6).

Statistics

Professional career

Seattle Seahawks
On May 8, 2015, Wade signed with the Seattle Seahawks of the National Football League (NFL) after going undrafted in the 2015 NFL Draft. He was waived on August 31, 2015.

Personal life
He is the son of Yu-Tandrain Smith and the late Reginald Wade.

References

External links
 UTSA Roadrunners bio
 247 bio
 Maxpreps bio

Living people
American football safeties
Seattle Seahawks players
1993 births
Sportspeople from Tyler, Texas
UTSA Roadrunners football players
Players of American football from Texas